Paris Pranaya is a 2003 Indian Kannada-language romantic drama film directed and written by Nagathihalli Chandrashekar. The film stars newcomers Raghu Mukherjee and Minal Patil in the lead role whilst Rajesh, Tara and Sharath Lohitashwa feature in other prominent roles. The film was produced by 21st Century Lions Cinema banner.

The film released on 18 April 2003 to generally positive reviews from critics. Extensively shot in many European locales such as Paris, Rome, Southern France and Spain, the film covers a scene of the annual "Vishwa Kannada Sammelana - 2002" held at Detroit. It went on to win awards at the Filmfare Awards South and Karnataka State Film Awards for the year 2003.

Cast
 Raghu Mukherjee as Krish alias Krishna
 Minal Patil as Poorvi
 Rajesh as H. K. Master 
 Sharath Lohitashwa as Aditya
 Tara as 'Cell' Seetha
 Harinath Policharla
 Sumalatha
 Sudha Belawadi
 Nagathihalli Chandrashekar guest appearance

Voice-over
 Rajesh Krishnan dubbed for Raghu Mukherjee
 Nanditha dubbed for Minal Patil

Music

The music of the film was composed by Stephen Prayog. The soundtrack focused mainly on the fusion music of Indian and western styles. Popular Bollywood playback singers Sonu Nigam and Shreya Ghoshal rendered their voices for the songs, with Ghoshal making her debut in Kannada cinema. The soundtrack included a pure Kannada light music song "Yede Thumbi Haadidenu" composed by Mysore Ananthaswamy and written by acclaimed poet G. S. Shivarudrappa. On the other side, it had the musical bits played by the giants of Western Classical Music such as Beethoven and Mozart. The track "Krishna Nee Begane Baaro" is an adaptation of the renowned classical song of the same name, originally composed and written by saint Vyasatirtha in the raga Yamuna Kalyani.

Awards
 Karnataka State Film Awards
 Best Music Director - Stephen Prayog
 Best Lyricist - Nagathihalli Chandrashekar
 Best Female Playback Singer - Nanditha

 Filmfare Awards South
 Best Film - Tumkur Dayanand

References

External source

 Movie review
 Soundtrack

2003 films
2003 romantic drama films
Films set in Europe
Films shot in Europe
Films set in Paris
Films shot in Paris
Films shot in Rome
Indian romantic drama films
2000s Kannada-language films
Films directed by Nagathihalli Chandrashekhar